Nuts! is a 2016 partly-animated documentary film billed as the "mostly true story" about the controversial medical doctor and radio magnate John R. Brinkley. The documentary is adapted from The Life of A Man: Biography of John R. Brinkley by Clement Wood, directed by Penny Lane and edited by Penny Lane and Thom Stylinski. Nuts! won the Special Jury Award for Editing at its Sundance premiere in 2016.

Plot 
Nuts!, narrated by Gene Tognacci, documents the life and career of John R. Brinkley (1885-1942), a Milford, Kansas druggist-turned physician who purportedly discovered a cure for male impotence by implanting goat testicles into the scrotums of his human patients. Largely through the testimonials of his "satisfied" customers, Brinkley enjoyed a period of fame and fortune before drawing the attention of Morris Fishbein, editor of the Journal of American Medicine, and the American Medical Association, which revoked his license.

Brinkley is credited for building the world's most powerful radio station for the time, KFKB (Kansas Folk Know Better), popularizing country or "hillbilly" music, and inventing the infomercial with his own diatribes about public health. Brinkley ran into trouble with the Federal Radio Commission (now the Federal Communications Commission), which shut down his radio station. In response, Brinkley built the "million-watt-regulation-skirting border-blaster", XERA, in Mexico and continued broadcasting.

Brinkley ran for governor of Kansas in 1930 as a write-in candidate. It was reported he might have won had thousands of votes not been disqualified, possibly illegally, by his opponents.

Brinkley's fame and fortune deteriorated when he sued Fishbein for libel. It is revealed late in the movie that Brinkley also faced numerous wrongful death suits, had dubious academic credentials, and had an arrest record.

Production 

The idea of making Nuts! came to Lane in 2009 when she read Charlatan: America's Most Dangerous Huckster, the Man Who Pursued Him, and the Age of Flimflam by Pope Brock. She found herself wondering if Brinkley's goat testicle cure worked, a question others asked her as she recounted the story. That current-day people could still be credulous, disappointed even, when she told them it was a "total quack cure" intrigued her.

In the film, Lane uses a variety of traditional and non-traditional documentary techniques and materials to tell Brinkley's story: animated re-creations, archival film footage (including home movies and newsreels), a narration adapter closely from The Life of a Man, and interviews with present-day experts. Voice over work is done by Andy Boswell, John Causby, Kelly Mizell, Jeff Pillars, Thom Stylinski, and Fran Taylor.

Lane deliberately structured the movie so the viewer is "in the shoes of someone who could be fooled" by Brinkley and his ability to spin a good tale. The first part of the documentary is told from Brinkley's point of view: the story Brinkley would have told. Later in the film it is revealed that the audience has been manipulated in this way.

Both Lane and writer Thom Stylinski were interested in playing with "the conventions of documentary to make a point". According to Stylinski, film makers, including those making documentaries, manipulate information and audiences need to be educated about this. On the website which accompanies the film, Lane provides readers and viewers with an extensive database called "Notes on Nuts!” with over 300 footnotes so people can check her facts and disclosing creative choices: where she stayed true to the factual record, altered the chronology of events, or "simply made things up out of whole cloth".

Reception 
Reviewers called Nuts! humorous, entertaining, stranger than fiction, and "catnip for audiences of a certain type".

Dennis Harvey wrote in Variety, "Lane and company created a sort of prankish ode to the classic American Dream of hard work and high ideals leading inevitably to fame, fortune and happiness. That's what Brinkley was really selling, and he mastered its packaging even if the content turned out to be mostly fraudulent".

Robert Abele wrote in the Los Angeles Times: "...if there is a chilling takeaway, it lies in the residue of consternation Lane leaves behind. You may think falling for goat glands is a pre-Internet age, snake-oil era folly. But call it something else, and who knows what you'll believe if the spiel is powerful enough?"

Ann Hornaday wrote that Lane's novel use of footnotes was a welcome and unique contribution to ongoing debates about truth and ethics in documentary film, but she also expressed concern that the footnotes appeared months after the movie's release, allowing "plenty of time for viewers to internalize the filmmaker's imaginary characters and outright fictions of historical truth".

References

Further reading 
Charlatan: America's Most Dangerous Huckster, the Man Who Pursued Him, and the Age of Flimflam 
Making Them Believe: How One of America's Legendary Rogues Marketed "The Goat Testicles Solution" and Made Millions  
The Bizarre Careers of John R. Brinkley 
The Life of A Man: Biography of John R. Brinkley

External links 

 
 

Notes on Nuts

2016 films
2010s American animated films
American documentary films
2010s biographical films
2016 documentary films
Cartuna
2010s English-language films
Films directed by Penny Lane
English-language documentary films